Lu Wanyao (born 19 July 1996), also known by her Japanese name  is a Chinese professional golfer.

Early years
Her parents are from Shanghai, China. They were table tennis players. Later, they moved to Japan. Lu Wanyao was the winner of 2013 Japan Women's Amateur Championship.

Professional wins (2)

LPGA of Japan Tour wins (1)
2017 Hokkaido Meiji Cup

Symetra Tour wins (1)
2015 Symetra Classic

References

External links

Profile on Symetra Tour site

Chinese female golfers
Japanese female golfers
Japanese sportspeople of Chinese descent
Sportspeople from Kagawa Prefecture
People from Takamatsu, Kagawa
1996 births
Living people